Pennsylvania Route 66 (PA 66) is a  state highway in Western Pennsylvania. Its southern terminus is at U.S. Route 119 (US 119) just east of Interstate 70 (I-70) near New Stanton. Its northern terminus is at US 6 in Kane.

The southernmost  of the route is a toll road named the Amos K. Hutchinson Bypass and is signed as PA Turnpike 66, a part of the Pennsylvania Turnpike System serving as a bypass of Greensburg. The Bypass runs between US 119 and US 22.  This portion is also part of Corridor M of the Appalachian Development Highway System.

Route description

Amos K. Hutchinson Bypass
PA Turnpike 66 begins in New Stanton at a cloverleaf interchange with US 119, immediately east of connections to  Interstate 70 and Interstate 76/Pennsylvania Turnpike. Up to Arona Road, its first interchange, no tolls are collected. The route then meets PA 136 before reaching the Hempfield Toll Plaza. Near Jeannette, PA Turnpike 66 interchanges with US 30 and PA 130. North of here, the road meets PA 66 Business before reaching the northern terminus of the same route  further north. At this point, PA Turnpike 66 becomes PA 66 and the freeway ends at a traffic signal just north. PA 66 then meets US 22 at a single-point urban interchange.

Westmoreland County

North of the Amos K. Hutchinson Bypass, PA 66 enters Salem Township as Sheridan Road. In Delmont, PA 66 is called Sheridan Road. In Washington Township, PA 66 passes west of Beaver Run Reservoir. In the village of Mamont, PA 66 intersects Pennsylvania Route 286. In the village of Poke Run north of PA 286, PA 66 intersects the eastern terminus of Pennsylvania Route 366. Then PA 66 intersects Pennsylvania Route 380, PA 380 west heads for downtown Pittsburgh. South of Oklahoma, PA 66 intersects the southern terminus of Pennsylvania Route 356. In the village of Paulton, PA 66 intersects the southern terminus of Pennsylvania Route 66 Alternate. PA 66 Alternate goes into Vandergrift and PA 66 goes into Apollo. In Oklahoma, PA 66 meets the northern terminus of Pennsylvania Route 819. In downtown Oklahoma, PA 66 turns to the east and crosses the Kiskiminetas River.

Armstrong County
After crossing the Kiskiminetas River, PA 66 has entered Armstrong County and begins a concurrency with Pennsylvania Route 56 in Apollo. As they began their concurrency, PA 56/PA 66 were called Warren Avenue in Apollo. As PA 56/PA 66 enter the boro of North Apollo they are paralleling the Kiskiminetas River. In the village of North Vandergrift, the concurrency between PA 56 and PA 66 ends when PA 66 intersects PA 66 Alternate and PA 56 and PA 66 ALT begin their own concurrency into Vandergrift. As PA 66 continues to parallel the Kiskiminetas River, it is called Lincoln Avenue. While paralleling the Kiskiminetas River, PA 66 has snake like curves. In Leechburg, PA 66 becomes Market Street, 3rd Street, and Pershing Avenue. As PA 66 exits Leechburg it is not paralleling the Kiskiminetas River. In Bethel Township, PA 66 meets the northern terminus of PA 66 Alternate. In Ford City, PA 66 becomes Main Street and intersects the northern terminus of Pennsylvania Route 128 at an "Y" intersection. Southeast of Kittanning, PA 66 begins a concurrency with U.S. Route 422 and Pennsylvania Route 28 at an interchange. At the next exit US 422 leaves the concurrency and PA 28/PA 66 continue north at-grade. In Rayburn Township, PA 28/PA 66 intersect the western terminus of Pennsylvania Route 85. In South Bethlehem, PA 28/PA 66 become Broad Street and meet the northern terminus of Pennsylvania Route 839.
The route then crosses the Redbank Creek into Clarion County after spending 43 miles in Armstrong County.

Clarion County

After crossing the Redbank Creek, PA 28/PA 66 have entered Clarion County. In New Bethlehem, The concurrency between PA 28 and PA 66 ends when PA 66 leaves PA 28. North of PA 28, PA 66 becomes Wood Street and intersects the eastern terminus of Pennsylvania Route 861. In Clarion Township, PA 66 begins a concurrency with Interstate 80 at exit 64. Then I-80/PA 66 meet Pennsylvania Route 68 at exit 62. After crossing the Clarion River, PA 66 leaves I-80 at exit 60 (trumpet interchange). PA 66 continues north at-grade. In Paint Township, PA 66 intersects U.S. Route 322 as Paint Boulevard. PA 66 continues towards the north paralleling rail road tracks. In Farmington Township, PA 66 intersects Pennsylvania Route 36.

Forest, Elk, and McKean counties
As PA 66 enters Forest County, PA 66 intersects the northern terminus of Pennsylvania Route 899. In Jenks Township, PA 66 enters Allegheny National Forest. As PA 66 enters Elk County, PA 66 has a  concurrency with Pennsylvania Route 948. Northeast of PA 948, PA 66 becomes Kane-Russell City Road. PA 66 enters McKean County as Fraley Street. In Kane, PA 66 ends at a "T" intersection with U.S. Route 6.

Tolls
The Amos K. Hutchinson Bypass portion of the route has tolls. Tolls are collected once during travel on the road, either at the mainline toll barrier, or at the exit or entrance point, depending on the possibility of reaching the mainline toll barrier during travel.  No toll is charged for travel between exits 0 and 1 or between exits 12 and 14. The Amos K. Hutchinson Bypass uses all-electronic tolling, with tolls payable by toll-by-plate (which uses automatic license plate recognition to take a photo of the vehicle's license plate and mail a bill to the vehicle owner) or E-ZPass. , the mainline toll barrier between exits 4 and 6 costs passenger vehicles $5.20 using toll-by-plate and $2.70 using E-ZPass. At the northbound exit and southbound entrance at exit 4 and the southbound exit and northbound entrance at exit 6, passenger vehicles are charged $4.40 using toll-by-plate and $1.80 using E-ZPass. The southbound exit and northbound entrance at exits 8 and 9 costs passenger vehicles $3.30 using toll-by-plate and $1.40 using E-ZPass.

Tolls along PA 66 were originally paid by cash or E-ZPass. At the mainline toll barrier, a staffed full service lane existed, accepting cash or credit cards. For most exit ramp tolls, exact change was required; however some automatic toll collection machines accepted paper money and gave change. All toll collecting machines gave receipts. On October 27, 2019, all-electronic tolling was implemented along the Amos K. Hutchinson Bypass section of PA 66.

Major intersections

Special routes

PA 66 Alternate
 

Pennsylvania Route 66 Alternate (PA 66 Alt.) is an  alternate route through Westmoreland County and Armstrong County, Pennsylvania. It leaves its parent route in Washington Township. It travels through the center of Oklahoma and Vandergrift, while the mainline route bypasses residential neighborhoods along the riverfront. PA 66 Alt. merges with PA 56 to cross the Kiskiminetas River. It becomes a separate route again in Parks Township (North Vandergrift), avoiding several riverfront towns as it travels along a hilly, rural stretch, before rejoining mainline PA 66 in Bethel Township.  From 1928 to 1938, the segment from North Vandergrift to the northern terminus was designated as PA 566.  

Major intersections

PA 66 Business

Pennsylvania Route 66 Business (PA 66 Bus.) is an  business route in Westmoreland County, Pennsylvania, connected two fingers of suburbia located east of Pittsburgh. The highway was signed PA 66 Business after PA 66 was shifted onto a newly created toll road bypass. The route begins nearly a mile south of the original terminus of PA 66, at a juncture with US 30 (which loops as a freeway around the city). It is cosigned with US 119 and PA 819 to the city center, before traveling on its own accord through several suburbanized miles. The route then becomes more rural, as it provides a free connection to the east-central edge of suburban Pittsburgh at Delmont. The highway is designated by PennDOT SR 0119 between US 30 and Pittsburgh Avenue in Greensburg (along the concurrency with US 119), then is part of SR 0066 north of there.

Major intersections

See also

References

External links

Pennsylvania Highways: PA 66
Pennsylvania Highways: PA Turnpike 66

066
Limited-access roads in Pennsylvania
Toll roads in Pennsylvania
Pennsylvania Turnpike Commission